Andres Jaramillo-Botero (born March 28, 1964) is a Colombian-American scientist and professor, working in computational chemical physics, known for his contributions to first-principles based modeling, design and characterization of nanoscale materials and devices.

Training and career 
Jaramillo-Botero earned a B.S. in Electrical Engineering from Boston University in 1986, an M.Sc. in Computer Science from the State University of New York as a Fulbright scholar in 1989, under the supervision of Kanad Ghose and Peter Kogge, and a Doctorate degree in engineering from the Polytechnic University of Valencia (UPV) in 1998 (Valencia, Spain), under the supervision of Alfons Crespo (at UPV) and co-supervision of William A. Goddard III (at Caltech). His doctoral work, developed primarily while at the California Institute of Technology and NASA's Jet Propulsion Laboratory during 1996–1997, contributed time-lower bound solution and algorithms to the n-body dynamics problem and their application at multiple length scales, from molecular  to macroscopic systems.  Jaramillo-Botero was an invited research scholar in Advanced Industrial Applications, of the Japan Industrial Technology Association, at the Robotics and Autonomous Machinery division of the Mechanical Engineering Laboratory (part of the National Institute of Advanced Industrial Science and Technology or AIST) between 1992 and 1993, where he focuses on real-time visual planning of robot trajectories.

In 2001, Jaramillo-Botero was received into the Pontifical Xavierian University honor society for his contributions to science and academia in Colombia. He was the founding chair of the Doctoral Engineering program, and the Electronics Engineering undergraduate program (1992-1998) at the Pontifical Xavierian University in Cali, where he also served, between 1990 and 2006, as the Engineering Faculty Dean, as a member of the university's board of directors, and as the computer science undergraduate program chair. He remains a full distinguished professor of the university.

Between 2002 and 2004, Jaramillo-Botero was a National Science Foundation (NSF) Fellow in the Nanoscale Science and Engineering program from the Institute for Pure and Applied Mathematics (IPAM), an NSF funded institute located on the University of California, Los Angeles (UCLA) campus.  At IPAM, his research focused on the development of the theoretical design for optimized dynamics response of molecular-level manipulators.

During 2004–2005, he returned to California Institute of Technology (Caltech) as a NSF Fellow and co-investigator of the NSF-funded Pan American Advanced Institute in Computational Nanotechnology and Molecular Engineering and since early 2006, as an Alien of extraordinary ability recipient (EB-1A category), joined the Institute full-time.  At California Institute of Technology (Caltech), he is a key Scientist of the Chemistry and Chemical Engineering division, and the Director of Multiscale Science and Simulation in the Materials and Process Simulation Center. Since 2018, he is also the lead Scientist and Director of the OMICAS Alliance; an international, multi-institutional research effort funded by the Colombian government and the World Bank to address food security and sustainable productivity, via Omics characterization and optimization of plant organisms.

Nanosciences research 
Jaramillo-Botero is recognized for the development and application of first-principles physicochemical based methods to understand, characterize, design and optimize nanoscale materials and materials' phenomena, devices and systems. His contributions span multiple fields of study, including: molecular hypervelocity impact phenomena in space missions, dynamics of materials in extreme conditions (non-adiabatic behavior), first-principles based atomistic and coarse-grain force field methods to study complex chemical processes, low-temperature crystalline thin film growth and characterization, single-molecule sensing and actuation nanodevices, and computational dynamics methods in large-scale multi body systems (from atomistic to continuum).

Personal life 
Jaramillo-Botero was raised, along with three siblings, to parents Jorge Jaramillo-Douat and Clara Ines Botero. Jaramillo-Botero is married to Maria Claudia Ojeda. They bore two children, Tomas (2004-) and Lucas (2000–2009).

U.S. Patents 
He holds multiple US and European patents as of 2016.

References 

American people of Colombian descent
Nanotechnologists
Living people
Boston University College of Engineering alumni
1964 births